The Rodna Mountains National Park is a protected area (national park category II IUCN) situated in Romania, in the administrative territory of counties Bistrița-Năsăud, Maramureș, and Suceava.

Location
The National Park is located in Northern Romania, in the Rodna Mountains, a subdivision of the Eastern Carpathians.

Description

Natural reserves included in the park: 
Bistrița-Năsăud County
Poiana cu narcise de pe Masivul Saca, 
Ineu-Lala, 
Izvoarele Mihăiesei, 
Maramureș County
Izvorul Bătrâna, 
Pietrosu Mare, scientific reservation 
Piatra Rea, scientific reservation 
Suceava County
Bila-Lala,

See also
 Maramureș Mountains Natural Park
 Protected areas of Romania
 Rodna Mountains

References 

National parks of Romania
Geography of Bistrița-Năsăud County
Geography of Maramureș County
Geography of Suceava County
Protected areas established in 2000
Tourist attractions in Maramureș County
Tourist attractions in Bistrița-Năsăud County
Tourist attractions in Suceava County